John Keith Vaughan (23 August 1912 – 4 November 1977), was a British painter.

Biography

Born at Selsey in West Sussex, Vaughan attended Christ's Hospital school. He worked in an advertising agency until the World War II, when as an intending conscientious objector he joined the St John Ambulance; in 1941 he was conscripted into the Non-Combatant Corps. Vaughan was self-taught as an artist. His first exhibitions took place during the war. In 1942 he was stationed at Ashton Gifford near Codford in Wiltshire, and paintings from this time include The Wall at Ashton Gifford (Manchester Art Gallery).

During the war Vaughan formed friendships with the painters Graham Sutherland and John Minton, with whom after demobilisation in 1946 he shared premises. Through these contacts he formed part of the neo-romantic circle of the immediate post-war period. However, Vaughan rapidly developed an idiosyncratic style which moved him away from the Neo-Romantics. Concentrating on studies of male figures, his works became increasingly abstract.

Vaughan worked as an art teacher at the Camberwell College of Arts, the Central School of Art and later at the Slade School.

Vaughan is also known for his journals, selections from which were published in 1966 and more extensively in 1989, after his death. A gay man troubled by his sexuality, he is known largely through those journals.  He was diagnosed with cancer in 1975 and died by suicide in 1977 in London, recording his last moments in his diary as the drugs overdose took effect.

The centenary of Keith Vaughan's birth was celebrated with an exhibition at Pallant House Gallery in Chichester, 'Keith Vaughan: Romanticism to Abstraction' (10 March to 10 June 2012).

His auction record of £313,250 was set at Sotheby's, London, on 11 November 2009, for the oil on canvas Theseus and the Minotaur, previously in the collection of Richard Attenborough (who bought it in 1967).

Exhibitions 

1944
 Keith Vaughan: Gouaches and Drawings, Alex Reid and Lefevre Gallery, London

1946
 Keith Vaughan: Paintings and Gouaches, Alex Reid and Lefevre Gallery, London

1948
 Keith Vaughan: Paintings and Gouaches, George Dix Gallery, New York
 Keith Vaughan: Paintings, Gouaches and Monotypes, Alex Reid and Lefevre Gallery, London

1950
 Keith Vaughan: Paintings and Gouaches, Instituto de Arte Moderno, Buenos Aires
 Gouaches, Redfern Gallery, London

1951
 Keith Vaughan: Paintings and Gouaches, Alex Reid and Lefevre Gallery, London

1952
 Keith Vaughan: Retrospective Exhibition, Redfern Gallery, London
 Keith Vaughan – Drawings for Rimbaud: Une Saison en Enfer, Hanover Gallery, London
 Keith Vaughan: Paintings and Gouaches, Durlacher Bros, New York

1953
 Keith Vaughan: Paintings, Leicester Galleries, London

1955
 Keith Vaughan: Gouaches, Leicester Galleries, London
 Keith Vaughan: Paintings and Gouaches, Durlacher Bros, New York

1956
 Keith Vaughan: New Paintings, Leicester Galleries, London
 Keith Vaughan: Retrospective Show, Hatton Gallery, Newcastle

1957
 Keith Vaughan: Travelling Retrospective, (based on Keith Vaughan: Retrospective Show, Hatton Gallery, Newcastle), Arts Council
 Keith Vaughan: Paintings and Gouaches, Durlacher Bros, New York

1958
 Keith Vaughan: Paintings, Leicester Galleries, London

1959
 Keith Vaughan: Paintings and Gouaches, Iowa State University, Ames, IA
 Keith Vaughan, Leicester Galleries, London

1960
 Keith Vaughan: Paintings, Gouaches and Drawings, Matthiesen Gallery, London

1962
 Keith Vaughan: Retrospective Exhibition, Whitechapel Gallery, London

1963
 Keith Vaughan: Drawings, Bienal de Sao Paulo

1964
 Keith Vaughan: Paintings, Gouaches and Charcoals, Marlborough New London Gallery, London

1965
 Keith Vaughan: Gouaches, Bear Lane Gallery, Oxford
 Keith Vaughan: Recent Gouaches, Marlborough Fine Art, London

1966
 Keith Vaughan: Paintings, Durlacher Bros, New York

1967
 Keith Vaughan: Retrospective Drawings, Tib Lane Gallery, Manchester

1968
 Keith Vaughan: Gouaches, Rex Evans Gallery, Los Angeles, CA
 Keith Vaughan: New Paintings, Marlborough Fine Art, London
 Keith Vaughan: Gouaches and Drawings 1942–46, Hamet Gallery, London

1969
 Keith Vaughan: Retrospective Exhibition, Mappin Gallery, Sheffield
 Keith Vaughan: Drawings, Tib Lane Gallery, Manchester

1970
 Keith Vaughan: Paintings, Gouaches and Drawings, Bear Lane Gallery, Oxford
 Keith Vaughan: Gouaches and Drawings, Hamet Gallery, London
 Keith Vaughan: Retrospective, University of York, York

1973
 Keith Vaughan: New Paintings, Waddington Galleries, London
 Keith Vaughan: Paintings in Gouaches, Victor Waddington Gallery, London

1976
 Keith Vaughan: New Paintings and Gouaches, Waddington Galleries, London
 Keith Vaughan: Paintings, Gouaches and Drawings, Tib Lane Gallery, Manchester
 Keith Vaughan: Paintings and Gouaches and Drawings, Compass Gallery, Glasgow

1977
 Keith Vaughan: Memorial Exhibition, Mappin Art Gallery, Sheffield

1981
 Keith Vaughan: Images of Man: Figurative Paintings: 1946–1960, Geffrye Museum, London and Birmingham City Museum and Art Gallery

1985
 Keith Vaughan: Drawings and Paintings, New Grafton Gallery, London
 Keith Vaughan: Early Drawings and Gouaches, Thomas Agnew & Sons, London

1987
 Keith Vaughan: Paintings and Drawings, New Grafton Gallery, London
 Keith Vaughan: Paintings, Gouaches, Watercolours and Drawings 1936–76, Austin/Desmond Fine Art, Sunninghill
 Keith Vaughan: Paintings, Watercolours and Drawings, Mercury Gallery, Edinburgh
 Keith Vaughan: Works on Paper, Garry Anderson Gallery, Darlinghurst

1989
 Keith Vaughan, Austin/Desmond Fine Art, London
 Keith Vaughan: Gouaches, Drawings, Notebook Sketches, Redfern Gallery, London

1990
 Keith Vaughan: Retrospective, Thomas Agnew & Sons, London
 Keith Vaughan: Paintings, Drawings, Gouaches, Anthony Hepworth Fine Art, Bath

1991
 Drawings of the Young Male, St Jude's, London
 Keith Vaughan: Drawings, Anthony Hepworth Fine Art, Bath

1994
 Keith Vaughan: Works on Paper, Redfern Gallery, London

1995
 Keith Vaughan: Les Illuminations de Rimbaud, an Exhibition of 42 Drawings, Deka, London
 Keith Vaughan: Paintings, Drawings and Gouaches, Anthony Hepworth Fine Art, Bath

1999
 Keith Vaughan: Gouaches and Drawings, Anthony Hepworth Fine Art, Bath

2000
 Keith Vaughan: Paintings, Gouaches, Drawings and Lithographs, Julian Lax, London

2002
 Keith Vaughan: Retrospective, Winter Fine Art and Antiques Fair, Olympia, London

2004
 Keith Vaughan: Drawings, Anthony Hepworth Fine Art, Bath

2007
 Keith Vaughan: Figure and Landscape, Victoria Art Gallery, Bath
 Keith Vaughan: A Selection of Early Work from the Collection of Peter Adam, Anthony Hepworth Fine Art, Bath
 Keith Vaughan: Paintings and Drawings, Osborne Samuel Gallery, London

2009
 Keith Vaughan: Drawings, Abbott and Holder, London

2010
 Drawings and Sketches for Paintings 1945–1960, Austin/Desmond Fine Art, London
 Keith Vaughan: Four Decades of Drawing, Gallery 27, London

2011
 Keith Vaughan: Gouaches, Drawings and Prints, Osborne Samuel Gallery, London
 Keith Vaughan: Works on Paper, Anthony Hepworth Fine Art, Bath

2012
 Keith Vaughan, Thomas Agnew & Sons, London
 Keith Vaughan: Works on Paper from the Estate of Keith Vaughan, Anthony Hepworth Fine Art, Bath
 Keith Vaughan: Romanticism to Abstraction, Pallant House Gallery, Chichester
 Keith Vaughan, Osborne Samuel Gallery, London

References 

 Keith Vaughan. Journals & Drawings, 1966, published in London by Alan Ross, 219 pages.
 Keith Vaughan: Journals 1939–1977, ed Alan Ross, 1989, published in London by John Murray, 217 pages, .
 Keith Vaughan, His Life and Work, Malcolm Yorke, 1990, published in London by Constable, 288 pages,  (Hardback)

External links

 Modern British Artists: Vaughan
 
 Observer review: Laura Cummings
 Independent on Sunday Review: Claudia Pritchard
 Daily Telegraph review: Richard Dorment
 Financial Times review: Richard Cork

1912 births
1977 deaths
Military personnel from Sussex
People educated at Christ's Hospital
British conscientious objectors
20th-century English painters
English male painters
English gay artists
Academics of the Central School of Art and Design
Personnel of the Non-Combatant Corps
People from Selsey
British art teachers
1977 suicides
20th-century English LGBT people
20th-century English male artists